Gautieria mexicana is a species of hypogeal fungus in the family Gomphaceae.

Gomphaceae
Fungi described in 1934